JS du Ténéré is a Nigerien football club based in Niamey. Their home games are played at the Stade Général Seyni Kountché.

Achievements
Niger Premier League: 2
 2000, 2001

Niger Cup: 4
 1997, 1998, 1999, 2000

Performance in CAF competitions
CAF Champions League: 1 appearance
2001 – First Round

CAF Cup Winners' Cup: 1 appearance
2000 – Quarter-Finals

Football clubs in Niger
Super Ligue (Niger) clubs
Sport in Niamey